The Georgia Review is a literary journal based in Athens, Georgia. Founded at University of Georgia in 1947, the journal features poetry, fiction, essays, book reviews, and visual art.  The journal has won National Magazine Awards for Fiction in 1986, for Essays in 2007, and for Profile Writing in 2020.  Works that appear in The Georgia Review are frequently reprinted in the Best American Short Stories and Best American Poetry and have won the Pushcart and O. Henry Prizes.

See also
List of literary magazines

References

External links
Official website

1947 establishments in Georgia (U.S. state)
Georgia (U.S. state) culture
Literary magazines published in the United States
Magazines established in 1947
Magazines published in Georgia (U.S. state)
Quarterly magazines published in the United States